The Konrad Adenauer is a German aircraft used by the government for official travel and diplomatic business. It is named after German statesman Konrad Adenauer.
Like all German governmental aircraft, the Konrad Adenauer is maintained by the Luftwaffe, 1st Division of the Air Force at Berlin Brandenburg Airport. Three different aircraft have carried the name, an Airbus A310 an Airbus A340 and an Airbus A350.

Konrad Adenauer (10+21) 1990–2011 

The first Konrad Adenauer was an Airbus A310-304 (msn 498), just like the other similar-purposed German aircraft Kurt Schumacher, Hermann Köhl and Theodor Heuss. The Konrad Adenauer had a white livery with the national colours of Germany (black-red-gold) around it and the words BUNDESREPUBLIK DEUTSCHLAND (Federal Republic of Germany). 

In February 2011, the Konrad Adenauer was used to safely evacuate citizens of 15 nations from Libya. Soon after, in April 2011, the A310-304 Konrad Adenauer was replaced by an Airbus A340-313 VIP purchased secondhand from Lufthansa, also named Konrad Adenauer. The A310-304 was eventually sold to French operator Novespace, subsidiary of French Space Study National Center (CNES) which currently operates the airframe as a zero-g aircraft to perform scientific research, astronaut training and public passenger flights under the  brand.

Konrad Adenauer (16+01) 2011–2022 

The second Konrad Adenauer is a former Lufthansa Airbus A340-313 (msn 274) re-configured into a VIP configuration with sleeping rooms and a wide variety of safety technology. This former Konrad Adenauer is capable of flying  non-stop, with the capability of transporting 143 passengers

In November 2022, the A340-313 Konrad Adenauer was replaced by an Airbus A350-900 handed over from Lufthansa Technik, also named Konrad Adenauer.

New Konrad Adenauer (10+01) 2022-Present 
The current Konrad Adenauer is a former Lufthansa Technik Airbus A350-900 re-configured into a VIP configuration with political-parliamentary operations, and has separate spaces to allow for private meetings, roundtables and other activities. The rest of the space in the aircraft has been given over to the delegations that typically travel with the VIPs. These areas have generous seating arrangements, bathrooms and modern galley equipment. As well as the visible alterations, the jet will have been fitted with cutting edge communications and radar technology. It may well have defensive systems on board too, but that’s the sort of thing governments like to keep tightly under wraps. All in, the aircraft will seat around 120 people and be capable of flying incredible ranges.

References

See also 
 Air transports of heads of state and government
 Boeing VC-25, the analogous plane used by the President of the United States.
https://web.archive.org/web/20110402145811/http://www.stern.de/politik/deutschland/neue-kanzlermaschine-konrad-adenauer-ist-startklar-1669331.html

Individual aircraft
Presidential aircraft
German special-purpose aircraft